Muheza is one of eleven administrative districts of Tanga Region in Tanzania. It is bordered to the north by Mkinga District, to the east by Tanga and the Indian Ocean, to the south by the Pangani District and Handeni District, and to the west by the Korogwe District. The administrative capital of the district is Muheza town. According to the 2002 Tanzania National Census, the population of the Muheza District was 279,423. According to the 2012 Tanzania National Census, the population of Muheza District had decreased to 204,461; this is less than ten years before, because Mkinga District was created that same year. The highest point in Muheza District is Kimbo Peak at 1,063m.

Administrative subdivisions

Wards
As of 2012, Muheza District is administratively divided into 33 wards:

 Amani
 Bwembwera
 Genge
 Kicheba
 Kigombe
 Kilulu
 Kisiwani
 Kwafungo

 Kwakifua
 Kwemkabala
 Lusanga
 Magila
 Magoroto
 Majengo 
 Masuguru
 Mbaramo

 Mbomole
 Mhamba
 Misalai
 Misozwe
 Mkuzi
 Mlingano
 Mpapayu
 Mtindiro

 Ngomeni
 Nkumba
 Pande Darajani
 Potwe
 Songa
 Tanganyika
 Tingeni
 Tongwe
 Zirai

Transport
Paved trunk road T13 from Segera to Tanga and the Kenyan border passes through the district. The Tanga-Arusha Railway passes through the district as well.

References

Districts of Tanga Region